Vanikoridae is a family of minute to medium-sized sea snails, marine gastropod molluscs in the superfamily Vanikoroidea.

Genera and species 
Genera within the family Vanikoridae include:
 Amamiconcha Habe, 1961
 Berthais Melvill, 1904
 Caledoniella Souverbie, 1869
 Constantia A. Adams, 1860
 † Cymenorytis  Cossmann, 1888
 Fossarella Thiele, 1925
 Japanonoba Habe & Ando, 1987
 † Kaawatina  Bartrum & Powell, 1928
 Larsenia Warén, 1989
 Macromphalina Cossmann, 1888
 Macromphalus S. V. Wood, 1842
 Megalomphalus  Brusina, 1871
 Naricava Hedley, 1913
 Nilsia Finlay, 1926
 Radinista Finlay, 1926
  A. Adams, 1863
 Talassia Warén & Bouchet, 1988
 Tropidorbis Iredale, 1936
 Tubiola A. Adams, 1863
 Vanikoro J.R.C. Quoy & J.P. Gaimard, 1832
 Zeradina Finlay, 1926
Genera brought into synonymy
 Chonebasis Pilsbry & Olsson, 1945: synonym of Macromphalina Cossmann, 1888
 Couthouyia A. Adams, 1860: synonym of Macromphalus S.V. Wood, 1842
 Epistethe Preston, 1912: synonym of Caledoniella Souverbie, 1869
 Gyrodisca Dall, 1896: synonym of Megalomphalus Brusina, 1871
 Korovina Iredale, 1918: synonym of Vanikoro Quoy & Gaimard, 1832
 Leucotis Swainson, 1840: synonym of Vanikoro Quoy & Gaimard, 1832
 Merria Gray, 1839: synonym of Vanikoro Quoy & Gaimard, 1832
 Narica d'Orbigny, 1842: synonym of Vanikoro Quoy & Gaimard, 1832

References 

 The Taxonomicon
 Vaught, K.C. (1989). A classification of the living Mollusca. American Malacologists: Melbourne, FL (USA). . XII, 195 pp

 
Vanikoroidea
Taxa named by John Edward Gray